The following highways are numbered 73:

Australia
 Batman Highway (Tasmania)

Canada
 Newfoundland and Labrador Route 73
  Quebec Autoroute 73

Germany
 Bundesautobahn 73
 Bundesstraße 73

India
 National Highway 73 (India)

Israel
 Highway 73 (Israel)

Japan
Okayama Expressway
Yonago Expressway

Malaysia
 Malaysia Federal Route 73

Netherlands
 A73 motorway (Netherlands)

New Zealand
  New Zealand State Highway 73

Philippines
 N73 highway (Philippines)

Poland
 National road 73 (Poland)

Spain
 Autovía A-73

United Arab Emirates
 Dubai Road 73

United Kingdom
 A73 road

United States
 Interstate 73
 U.S. Route 73
 Alabama State Route 73
 Arizona State Route 73
 Arkansas Highway 73
 California State Route 73
 Connecticut Route 73
 Florida State Road 73
 County Road 73A (Calhoun County, Florida)
 County Road 73B (Calhoun County, Florida)
 Georgia State Route 73
 Georgia State Route 73E (former)
 Georgia State Route 73W (former)
 Illinois Route 73
 Indiana State Road 73 (former)
 Kentucky Route 73
 Louisiana Highway 73
 Louisiana State Route 73 (former)
 Maine State Route 73
 Maryland Route 73 (former)
 M-73 (Michigan highway)
 Minnesota State Highway 73
 County Road 73 (Dakota County, Minnesota)
 County Road 73 (Hennepin County, Minnesota)
 County Road 73 (Ramsey County, Minnesota)
 Missouri Route 73
 Nebraska Highway 73 (former)
 Nebraska Recreation Road 73A
 Nevada State Route 73 (former)
 New Jersey Route 73
 County Route 73 (Bergen County, New Jersey)
 New Mexico State Road 73
 New York State Route 73
 County Route 73 (Dutchess County, New York)
 County Route 73 (Erie County, New York)
 County Route 73 (Oneida County, New York)
 County Route 73 (Onondaga County, New York)
 County Route 73 (Orleans County, New York)
 County Route 73 (Putnam County, New York)
 County Route 73 (Rockland County, New York)
 County Route 73 (Suffolk County, New York)
 County Route 73A (Suffolk County, New York)
 North Carolina Highway 73
 North Dakota Highway 73
 Ohio State Route 73
 Oklahoma State Highway 73
 Oklahoma State Highway 73 (1930s-1950s) (former)
 Pennsylvania Route 73
 South Carolina Highway 73 (former)
 South Dakota Highway 73
 Tennessee State Route 73
 Texas State Highway 73
 Texas State Highway Loop 73 (former)
 Texas State Highway Spur 73
 Texas State Highway Spur 73 (1939) (former)
 Farm to Market Road 73
 Texas Park Road 73
 Utah State Route 73
 Vermont Route 73
 Virginia State Route 73
 West Virginia Route 73
 Wisconsin Highway 73
 Wyoming Highway 73

Territories
 U.S. Virgin Islands Highway 73

See also 
 A73 roads